North Carolina Highway 205 (NC 205) is a primary state highway in the U.S. state of North Carolina. It traverses  in Stanly and Union Counties.

Route description
NC 205 is a two-lane rural highway that goes through mostly farmland, as it connects the towns of Marshville, Oakboro, and Red Cross.

History
Established in 1935, it is the second incarnation NC 205, creating a new primary routing between the towns of Marshville and Red Cross. In the late 1940s, it was extended southwest along Main Street to the new alignment of US 74; it then changed by 1953 onto a new extension of Elm Street to US 74, leaving Main Street.

The first NC 205 was an original state highway (1921), connecting Kings Mountain to Grover. In 1926, US 29 was added to all of NC 205. In late 1934, NC 205 was dropped, leaving behind US 29 and NC 216.

Junction list

References

205
Transportation in Union County, North Carolina
Transportation in Stanly County, North Carolina